The 1985–86 season was Galatasaray's 82nd in existence and the 28th consecutive season in the 1. Lig. This article shows statistics of the club's players in the season, and also lists all matches that the club have played in the season.

Squad statistics

Players in / out

In

Out

1. Lig

Standings

Matches

Türkiye Kupası
Kick-off listed in local time (EET)

5th Round

6th round

1/4 final

1/2 final

European Cup Winners' Cup

1st round

2nd round

Başbakanlık Kupası
Kick-off listed in local time (EET)

Friendly Matches
Kick-off listed in local time (EET)

TSYD Kupası

Donanma Kupası

Attendance

See also
List of unbeaten football club seasons

References

 Tuncay, Bülent (2002). Galatasaray Tarihi. Yapı Kredi Yayınları

External links
 Galatasaray Sports Club Official Website 
 Turkish Football Federation – Galatasaray A.Ş. 
 uefa.com – Galatasaray AŞ

Galatasaray S.K. (football) seasons
Turkish football clubs 1985–86 season
1980s in Istanbul
Galatasaray Sports Club 1985–86 season